Kalevi Kotkas (10 August 1913 – 24 August 1983) was an Estonian-born Finnish athlete, specializing in high jump, discus throw and shot put. He became the first ever European champion in high jump, in 1934 in Turin, and competed in the 1932 and 1936 Summer Olympics. In 1936 he cleared the same height of 2.00 m as the medalists Dave Albritton and Delos Thurber, but made more attempts and was placed fourth.

Kalevi Kotkas set four European records in high jump, but two of them – achieved in Rio de Janeiro in 1934 – were never ratified. The ratified records were 2.03 meters (Helsinki, 12 July 1936) and 2.04 meters (Gothenburg, 1 September 1936).

National titles
Finnish Athletics Championships
High jump: 1934, 1935, 1936, 1937, 1938
Discus throw: 1933, 1934, 1935, 1936, 1937, 1938

International competitions

References

1913 births
1983 deaths
Athletes from Tallinn
People from the Governorate of Estonia
Finnish male high jumpers
Finnish male discus throwers
Olympic athletes of Finland
Athletes (track and field) at the 1932 Summer Olympics
Athletes (track and field) at the 1936 Summer Olympics
European Athletics Championships medalists
Finnish people of Estonian descent
Finnish male shot putters
Estonian emigrants to Finland